The St. Peter Sandstone is an Ordovician geological formation. It belongs to the Chazyan stage of the Champlainian series in North American regional stratigraphy, equivalent to the late Darriwilian global stage. This sandstone originated as a sheet of sand in clear, shallow water near the shore of a Paleozoic sea and consists of fine-to-medium-size, well-rounded quartz grains with frosted surfaces. The extent of the formation spans north–south from Minnesota to Arkansas and east–west from Illinois into Nebraska and South Dakota. The formation was named by Owen (1847) after the Minnesota River, then known as the St. Peter River. The type locality is at the confluence of the Mississippi and Minnesota Rivers near Fort Snelling, Minnesota. In eastern Missouri the stone consists of quartz sand that is 99.44% silica.

Outcrop
In Minnesota, the soft St. Peter Sandstone can be observed at the bluffs of the Mississippi River valley beneath a very thin layer of Glenwood Shale, which lies below a much thicker layer of Platteville limestone. Examples can be seen at Minnehaha Falls in Minneapolis, the bluffs from downtown to Mounds Park in Saint Paul, and Minneopa Falls near Mankato. In Illinois, Castle Rock is a large bluff of St. Peter Sandstone, and Starved Rock State Park and Matthiessen State Park feature numerous outcroppings and canyons.

Commercial use
St. Peter sandstone, also called "Ottawa Sand" in commercial applications, has a relatively uniform size and shape for each grain. It is used for the manufacture of glass, for filter and molding sand, and for abrasives. Its purity is especially important to glassmakers. It is also important as a "frac sand" in oil and gas drilling – loose sand is pumped in a liquid mix under high pressure into a well where the sand grains wedge into and hold open any fractures in the rock, enhancing the extraction of hydrocarbons. The uniform particle size also makes the sand useful for laboratory experiments.

Mining locations
St. Peter sandstone is or has been mined

Arkansas: Guion, Arkansas
Illinois: Ottawa, Illinois, Sheridan, Illinois, Wedron, Illinois, and Naplate, Illinois
Minnesota: Kasota, Minnesota and Ottawa Township, Minnesota
Missouri: Pacific, Festus, Crystal City, Augusta, and Pevely

The Unimin corporation is a large producer of commercial sand and operates the surface mines in many of these locations.

Notes

References
 Unklesbay, A.G; & Vineyard, Jerry D. (1992). Missouri Geology – Three Billion Years of Volcanoes, Seas, Sediments, and Erosion. University of Missouri Press. .
 Void ratio of sand Argonne National Laboratory, Division of Educational Program
 Twin Cities Geology - Mississippi National River and Recreation Area. National Park Service
 Generalized Stratigraphic Column of West Virginia

Ordovician System of North America
Sandstone formations of the United States
Ordovician Arkansas
Ordovician Illinois
Ordovician Iowa
Ordovician Minnesota
Ordovician Missouri
Ordovician geology of South Dakota
Ordovician geology of Wisconsin
Geologic formations of Nebraska